Left Opposition of PCE was initially founded as an internal tendency within the Communist Party of Spain (PCE), but later evolved into an independent formation. It started publishing Voz comunista in 1973.

OPI-PCE promoted abstention in the 1976 referendum. In 1977 OPI-PCE founded the Workers' Communist Party (PCT).

Communist Party of Spain
Defunct communist parties in Spain
Political party factions